The 2011 Nigerian Senate election in Ondo State was held on April 9, 2011, to elect members of the Nigerian Senate to represent Ondo State. Robert Ajayi Boroffice representing Ondo North, Akinyelure Patrick Ayo representing Ondo Central and Kunle Boluwaji representing Ondo South all won on the platform of Labour Party.

Overview

Summary

Results

Ondo North 
Labour Party candidate Robert Ajayi Boroffice won the election, defeating other party candidates.

Ondo Central 
Labour Party candidate Akinyelure Patrick Ayo won the election, defeating other party candidates.

Ondo South 
Labour Party candidate Kunle Boluwaji won the election, defeating party candidates.

References 

Ondo State Senate elections
Ondo State senatorial elections
Ondo State senatorial elections